Chrysodeixis permissa is a moth of the family Noctuidae first described by Francis Walker in 1858. It is found in India, Sri Lanka, and the Maldives.

References

Moths of Asia
Moths described in 1858
Plusiinae